Hazara Falls is 191 km from Nagpur, 33 km from Darekasa and close to the Gondia district. 
Hazara Falls, in Salekasa tehsil is a major tourist attraction during the rainy season. August to December is best time to go. It is located 1 km from Darekasa railway station. The place is also ideal for camping as well as trekking activities.

References

Waterfalls of Maharashtra